The Sacred Heart  Cathedral is located in Bamako, the capital of Mali it serves as the cathedral of the Archdiocese of Bamako.

History
Bamako was originally a traditional village. It gradually urbanizing the late nineteenth century, increasingly attracting newcomers especially after his erection as the seat of government of the colony in 1897. It was in Kati (about 15 km from Bamako) that is set to the end of 1897, the first Catholic mission from which catholic priests visited Christians in Bamako: officers, merchants, workers and soldiers mostly. In 1907 the Catholic mission of Kati acquired land in Bamako and in 1910 built a building that served as a chapel for regular services. Construction of the cathedral began, however, the February 21, 1925, with the blessing of the first stone by Archbishop Sauvant, in the presence of Marshal Petain. Two years later, the building is in service. Bamako Cathedral was completed in 1936. Until 1957, it was the only official place of Catholic worship in the city. Bishop Pierre-Louis Leclerc was installed as the first archbishop of Bamako on 21 February 1956. He was buried in the cathedral in 1988.

See also
Roman Catholicism in Mali
Sacred Heart Cathedral (disambiguation)

References

Roman Catholic cathedrals in Mali
Buildings and structures in Bamako
Roman Catholic churches completed in 1927
20th-century Roman Catholic church buildings